Per Aru is a river in Northern Province, Sri Lanka. The river rises in northern Vavuniya District, before flowing north/north-east through Vavuniya District and Mullaitivu District. The river empties into Nanthi Kadal lagoon.

See also 
 List of rivers in Sri Lanka

References 

Rivers of Sri Lanka
Bodies of water of Mullaitivu District
Bodies of water of Vavuniya District